Holcocerus holosericeus is a species of moth of the family Cossidae. It is found in Kazakhstan, Mongolia, Kyrgyzstan, Uzbekistan, Tajikistan, Turkmenistan, north-western China, Afghanistan, Iran, Israel, Jordan, the United Arab Emirates, Egypt, Algeria, Tunisia, Libya and Morocco. The habitat consists of deserts.

The length of the forewings is 13–19 mm for males and 17–23 mm for females. The wings are pure white. Adults have been recorded on wing from April to May and in December in Israel.

Subspecies
Holcocerus holosericeus holosericeus
Holcocerus holosericeus darwesthana Daniel, 1959 (south-western Afghanistan, southern Iran)
Holcocerus holosericeus faroulti Oberthür, 1911 (Israel, Jordan, the United Arab Emirates, Egypt, Tunisia, Libya, Morocco)

References

Moths described in 1884
Cossinae
Moths of Asia
Moths of Africa